The iSimangaliso Marine Protected Area is a coastal and offshore marine protected area in KwaZulu-Natal from the South Africa-Mozambique border in the north to Cape St Lucia lighthouse in the south.

History
The original St Lucia and Maputaland MPAs were proclaimed in the 1970s to protect the coral reefs and the beaches where loggerhead and leatherback turtles make their nests. The Maputaland Marine Protected Area, also known as the Maputaland Marine Reserve, was a marine protected area (MPA) along the Indian Ocean coastline of northern KwaZulu-Natal, South Africa. The Maputaland MPA, which forms part of iSimangaliso Wetland Park, extended a distance of  seawards from the coast between the Mozambique border and Gobey's Point near Lake Sibhayi. To the south it abuts the St Lucia Marine Protected Area. 

In 1998 these MPAs were combined, and a large offshore restricted zone, the iSimangaliso Offshore Marine Protected Area, added in 2019 to become the iSimangaliso MPA. The MPA includes the country's most north-eastern stretch of coastline, is South Africa's only UNESCO marine World Heritage Site and the second largest protected area in the country after the Kruger National Park. iSimangaliso is a Zulu word that means "miracle and wonder".

This subtropical area includes forests dotted with lakes and swamps, as well as coral reefs and deserted beaches. The deep, soft sediment provides homes for spider crabs and deep water rock lobsters.

Purpose

A marine protected area is defined by the IUCN as "A clearly defined geographical space, recognised, dedicated and managed, through legal or other effective means, to achieve the long-term conservation of nature with associated ecosystem services and cultural values".

The offshore extension is intended for the protection of deep water ecosystems and to secure the habitat and foraging areas of endangered Leatherback turtles and coelacanths.

The stated objectives include contribution to the national and global system of marine protected areas by protecting sensitive and endangered ecosystems in a large contiguous area which connects inshore and offshore habitats, to provide sustainable ecotourism through appropriate zonation, to protect spawning stock, which may allow stock recovery and increase abundance both in the protected and adjacent areas, and to protect particular species and their habitats. This includes the canyons and the known coelacanth population, and cold-water corals, and breeding areas for turtle species.

Extent
The original length of the protected shoreline is 145 km, and the area of protected ocean is 443 km2
The additional offshore controlled area of  makes this the largest MPA in the South African network. Th length of coast is increased to 220 km and surface area to 13 289 km2

Boundaries
The boundaries of the MPA are:
Northern border: S26°51.515', E32°53.454' to S26º59.376’, E33º27.366′
Eastern border: S26º59.376’, E33º27.366′ to S28º31.3265’, E33º27.755’
Southern border: S28º31.3265’, E33º27.755’ to S28°31.174′, E32°24.0587′
Western border: S28°31.174′, E32°24.0587′ to S26°51.515', E32°53.454' along the high-water mark, excluding estuaries.

Zonation
The Maputaland and St Lucia Marine Reserves form a continuous protected area stretching 150 km from the Mozambique border to Cape Vidal for 3 nautical miles out to sea. These are now part of the iSimangaliso MPA.

Inshore zonation
The inshore zones lie between the high water mark and low water mark, except the controlled pelagic area which extends 100 m seawards of the high water mark.

iSimangaliso inshore sanctuary zone 1: (South African-Mozambique border to 500 m north of the Kosi North Bank)
An inshore sanctuary zone between the high water and low water marks
Northern boundary: A line east-south-east from S26°51.5148', E32°53.4527' at the South Africa-Mozambique border
Southern border: A line bearing east from S26°53.411', E32°52.844'.

iSimangaliso inshore controlled pelagic zone 1: (500 m north of the Kosi north bank to 2 km south of the mouth of the Kosi Lake)
A controlled pelagic zone between the high water mark and a line 100 m seawards of the high water mark
Northern boundary: A line bearing east from S26°53.411', E32°52.844'.
Southern boundary: A line bearing east from S26°54.???', E32°52.847'

iSimangaliso inshore sanctuary zone 2: (2 km south of the mouth of the Kosi Lake to beacon N13)
An inshore sanctuary zone between the high water and low water marks
Northern boundary: A line bearing east from S26°54.???', E32°52.847'
Southern boundary: A line bearing east from S26°56.999', E32°52.349'

iSimangaliso inshore controlled pelagic zone 2: (Beacon N13 to Boteler Point)
A controlled pelagic zone between the high water mark and a line 100 m seawards of the high water mark
Northern boundary: A line bearing east from S26°56.999', E32°52.349'
Southern boundary: A line bearing east from S27°00.835', E32°52.010'

iSimangaliso inshore sanctuary zone 3: (Boteler Point to 1 km south of Dog Point)
An inshore sanctuary zone between the high water and low water marks
Northern boundary: A line bearing east from S27°00.835', E32°52.010'
Southern boundary: A line bearing east from S27°06.935', E32°50.198'

iSimangaliso Inshore Controlled Pelagic Zone 3 (1 km south of Dog Point to north of Sodwana Bay)
A controlled pelagic zone between the high water mark and a line 100 m seawards of the high water mark
Northern boundary: A line bearing east from S27°06.935', E32°50.198'
Southern boundary: A line bearing east from S27°31.583', E32°40.411'

iSimangaliso Inshore Controlled Zone 1: (North of Sodwana Bay to Sodwana lighthouse)
A controlled area is situated between the high water and low water marks
Northern boundary: A line bearing east from S27°31.583', E32°40.411'
Southern boundary: A line bearing east from S27°32.737', E32°40.745'

iSimangaliso Inshore Controlled Pelagic Zone 4: (Sodwana lighthouse to Red Sands)
A controlled pelagic zone between the high water mark and a line 100 m seawards of the high water mark
Northern boundary: A line bearing east from S27°31.583', E32°40.411'
Southern boundary: A line bearing east from S27°43.067', E32°37.610'

iSimangaliso Inshore Wilderness Zone 1: (Red Sands to Leven Point)
A wilderness area is situated between the high water and low water marks
Northern boundary: A line bearing east from S27°43.067', E32°37.610'
Southern boundary: A line bearing east from S27°55.864', E32°35.659'

iSimangaliso Inshore Controlled Pelagic Zone 5: (Leven Point to 4 km north of Cape Vidal)
A controlled pelagic zone between the high water mark and a line 100 m seawards of the high water mark
Northern boundary: A line bearing east from S27°55.864', E32°35.659'
Southern boundary: A line bearing east from S28°05.104', E32°33.616'

iSimangaliso Inshore Controlled Zone 2: (4 km North of Cape Vidal to 1 km south of Cape Vidal)
A controlled area is situated between the high water and low water marks 
Northern boundary: A line bearing east from S28°05.104', E32°33.616'
Southern boundary: A line bearing east from S28°08.694', E32°33.306'

iSimangaliso Inshore Controlled Pelagic Zone 6: (1 km south of Cape Vidal to 6.5 km north of Mziki path)
A controlled pelagic zone between the high water mark and a line 100 m seawards of the high water mark
Northern boundary: A line bearing east from S28°08.694', E32°33.306'
Southern boundary: A line bearing east from S28°12.171', E32°31.700'

iSimangaliso Inshore Sanctuary Zone 4: (6.5 km north of Mziki Path to Mziki Path)
An inshore sanctuary zone between the high water and low water marks
Northern boundary: A line bearing east from S28°12.171', E32°31.700'
Southern boundary: A line bearing east from S28°15.335', E32°29.929'

iSimangaliso Inshore Controlled Pelagic Zone 7: (Mziki Path to 2 km north of the St Lucia swimming beach)
A controlled pelagic zone between the high water mark and a line 100 m seawards of the high water mark
Northern boundary: A line bearing east from S28°15.335', E32°29.929'
Southern boundary: A line bearing east from S28°21.???', E32°26.384'

iSimangaliso Inshore Controlled Zone 3: (2 km north of the St Lucia swimming beach to 1.6 km
south of Maphelane Point)
A controlled area is situated between the high water and low water marks 
Northern boundary: A line bearing east from S28°21.???', E32°26.384'
Southern boundary: A line bearing east from S28°25.356', E32°25.642'

iSimangaliso Inshore Controlled Pelagic Zone 8: (1.6 km south of Maphelane Point to Middle Railway Ledges)
A controlled pelagic zone between the high water mark and a line 100 m seawards of the high water mark
Northern boundary: A line bearing east from S28°25.356', E32°25.642'
Southern boundary: A line bearing east from S28°27.745', E32°25.030'

iSimangaliso Inshore Sanctuary Zone 5: (Middle Railway Ledges to 500 m south of the Cape St Lucia Lighthouse)
An inshore sanctuary zone between the high water and low water marks
Northern boundary: A line bearing east from S28°27.745', E32°25.030'
Southern boundary: A line bearing east from S28°31.171', E32°24.176'

Offshore zonation
The offshore zones are bounded inshore by the low water mark and offshore by a line parallel to the low water mark at a distance of three nautical miles to seaward.

iSimangaliso offshore sanctuary zone 1: (Mozambique border to beacon N13)
An offshore sanctuary zone between the low water mark and a distance of three nautical miles offshore of the low water mark
Northern boundary: A line east-south east from S26°51.515', E32°53.453' at the South Africa-Mozambique border
Southern boundary: A line due east from S26°56.999' E32°52.349'

iSimangaliso offshore controlled pelagic zone 1: (beacon N13 to Boteler Point)
An offshore controlled pelagic area between the low water mark and a distance of three nautical miles offshore of the low water mark
Northern boundary: A line due east from S26°56.999', E32°52.349'
Southern boundary: A line due east from S27°00.835', E32°52.010'

iSimangaliso offshore sanctuary zone 2: (Boteler Point to 1 km south of Dog Point)
An offshore sanctuary zone between the low water mark and a distance of three nautical miles offshore of the low water mark
Northern boundary: A line due east from S27°00.835', E32°52.010'
Southern boundary: A line due east from S27°06.935', E32°50.108'

iSimangaliso offshore controlled pelagic zone 2: (1 km south of Dog Point to north of Sodwana Bay)
An offshore controlled pelagic area between the low water mark and a distance of three nautical miles offshore of the low water mark
Northern boundary: A line due east from S27°06.935' E32°50.108'
Southern boundary: A line due east from S27°31.583', S32°40.411'

iSimangaliso offshore controlled zone 1: (North of Sodwana Bay to the Sodwana lighthouse)
An offshore controlled zone between the low water mark and a distance of three nautical miles offshore of the low water mark
Northern boundary: A line due east from S27°31.583', E32°40.411'
Southern boundary: A line due east from S27°32.737', E32°40.775'

iSimangaliso offshore controlled pelagic zone 3 (Sodwana lighthouse to Red Sands)
An offshore controlled pelagic area between the low water mark and a distance of three nautical miles offshore of the low water mark
Northern boundary: A line due east from S27°32.737', E32°40.775'
Southern boundary: A line due east from S27°43.067', E32°37.610'

iSimangaliso offshore wilderness zone 1: (Red Sands to Leven Point)
An offshore wilderness zone between the low water mark and a distance of three nautical miles offshore of the low water mark
Northern boundary: A line due east from S27°43.067', E32°37.610'
Southern boundary: A line due east from S27°55.864', E32°35.659'

iSimangaliso offshore controlled pelagic zone 4: (Leven Point to 4 km north of the Cape Vidal on-ramp)
An offshore controlled pelagic area between the low water mark and a distance of three nautical miles offshore of the low water m*An offshore sanctuary zone between the low water mark and a distance of three nautical miles offshore of the low water mark
Northern boundary: A line due east from S27°55.864', E32°35.659'
Southern boundary: A line due east from S28°05.184', E32°33.616'

iSimangaliso offshore controlled zone 2: (4 km north of the Cape Vidal on-ramp to 1 km south of Cape
Vidal.)
An offshore controlled zone between the low water mark and a distance of three nautical miles offshore of the low water mark
Northern boundary: A line due east from S28°05.184', E32°33.616'
Southern boundary: A line due east from S28°08.694', E32°33.306'

iSimangaliso offshore controlled pelagic zone 5: (1 km south of Cape Vidal to 2 km north of the St Lucia
swimming beach)
An offshore controlled pelagic area between the low water mark and a distance of three nautical miles offshore of the low water mark
Northern boundary: A line due east from S28°08.694', E32°33.306'
Southern boundary: A line due east from S28°21.???', E32°26.384'

iSimangaliso offshore controlled zone 3: (2 km north of the St Lucia swimming beach to 1.6 km south of Maphelane Point)
An offshore controlled zone between the low water mark and a distance of three nautical miles offshore of the low water mark
Northern boundary: A line due east from S28°21.???', E32°26.384'
Southern boundary: A line due east from S28°25.356', E32°25.642'

iSimangaliso offshore controlled pelagic zone 6: (1.6 km south of Maphelane Point to 500 m south of the Cape St Lucia Lighthouse)
An offshore controlled pelagic area between the low water mark and a distance of three nautical miles offshore of the low water mark
Northern boundary: A line due east from S28°25.356', E32°25.642'
Southern boundary: A line due east from S28°31.171', E32°24.176'

Restricted areas
The offshore extension area from 3 nautical miles seaward of the low water mark to the offshore boundaries of the MPA.

iSimangaliso offshore restricted zone 1: (offshore extension)
A restricted area with inshore (western) boundary at three nautical miles from the low water mark from S28°31.345', E32°27.718' to S26°52.356', E32°56.723'
Northern boundary: S26°52.356', E32°56.723' to S26°58.881', E33°22.345'
Eastern boundary: S26°58.881', E33°22.345' to S28°31.345', E33°22.345'
Southern boundary: S28°31.345', E33°22.345' to S28°31.345', E32°27.718'

Management
The marine protected areas of South Africa are the responsibility of the national government, which has management  agreements with a variety of MPA management authorities, in this case, the iSimangaliso Wetland Park Authority, which manages the MPA with funding from the SA Government through the Department of Environmental Affairs (DEA).

The Department of Agriculture, Forestry and Fisheries is responsible for issuing permits, quotas and law enforcement.

Use

Activities requiring a permit

Fishing
The game and bait fish that be caught in the controlled-pelagic zone of the MPA are in the following families, and all species in these families may be caught.

Pelagic gamefish species:
Carangidae (garrick, kingfish, queenfish, yellowtail)
Coryphaenidae (dorado)
Istiophoridae (marlin and sailfish)
Pomatomidae (elf/shad)
Rachycentridae (cobia/prodigal son)
Scombridae (mackerels, tuna, wahoo)
Sphyraenidae (barracudas)
Pelagic baitfish species:
Atherinidae (silversides)
Belonidae (garfish)
Chirocentridae (wolfherring)
Clupeidae (red-eyes, sardines)
Engraulidae (anchovies, glass-noses)
Exocoetidae (flying fish)
Hemiramphidae (halfbeaks)
Scomberesocidae (sauries)

Scuba diving

A permit is required to scuba dive in any MPA in South Africa, including the recreational dive sites of the iSimangaliso Marine Protected Area. These permits are valid for a year and are available at some branches of the Post Office. Temporary permits, valid for a month, may be available at dive shops or from dive boat operators who operate in an MPA. A personal recreational scuba diving permit is valid in all South African MPAs where recreational diving is allowed. The business permit to operate recreational scuba business operations in an MPA is restricted to a specific MPA. Diving for commercial or scientific purposes is also subject to permit.

Named dive sites
Some of the dive sites are so close to each other that the available resolution of position does not distinguish between them.

1/4 mile Reef (10 m)  
Bikini (22 m)  
Bikini 2  
Bikini 3  
Bikini North  
Hopscotch north (26 m)  
Mellow Yellow south (18 m)  
2 mile 2-Buoy (14 m)  
2 mile 2-Buoy block  
2 mile 4-Buoy (14 m)  
2 mile 4-Buoy block  
2 mile Antons (16 m)  
2 mile Antons S tip (16 m)  
2 mile Antons south  
2 mile Arches (14 m)  
2 mile Ash 1  
2 mile Catt N  
2 mile Catt Reef (18 m) 
2 mile Caves (14 m) 
2 mile Caves  
2 mile Caves & Overhangs 16 m  
2 mile Caves north  
2 mile Chain (14 m)  
2 mile Chain Pieter  
2 mile Coral Gardens (14 m)  
2 mile Grand Central (14 m)  
2 mile Grave (30 m)  
2 mile Hot spots north (30 m)  
2 mile Hot Spots south	(30 m)  
2 mile Hotspots (30 m)  
2 mile Pinnacle (14 m)  
2 mile Pinnacles (14 m)  
2 mile Pinnacles block  
2 mile Pinnacles south  
2 mile S-Chain (18 m)  
2 mile Simons  
2 mile Simon's Cave (18 m)  
2 mile Tiles 1  
2 mile Waynes World  
2 mile Wayne's World (14 m)  
2 mile	Zambi Alley (16 m)  
2 outside Deep Sponge (35 m)  
2 outside Deep Sponge / Tombstone (30 m)  
2 outside Deep Sponge 2 (30 m)  
2 outside Sponge (35 m)  
2 outside Sponge (19 m)  
2 Roonies (30 m)  
2 Roonies  
2 Roonies north  
2 Stringer (14 m)  
2 Stringer  
3 mile (23 m)  
3 mile	 
3 mile Pin  
5 Canyon (48 m)  
5 Canyon  
5 Canyon Wall (38–46 m)  
5 Fusilier (21 m)  
5 Fusilier  
5 mile	(23 m)  
5 mile 5 pin  
5 mile Cabbage	30 m  
5 mile Gotham (46 m)  
5 mile Lettuce - Uniform 30 m  
5 mile Pachycerus (36 m)  
5 mile Pothole (22 m)  
5 mile Ribbon (19 m)  
5 mile Ribbon North (19 m)  
5 mile Ribbon South  
6 mile Snapper College 26 m  
7 mile North 22 m  
7 mile North  
7 mile South (22 m)  
7 mile South  
7-Mile north  
7-Mile northern  
7 mile Amphitheatre (20 m)  
7 mile Castle R  
7 mile Mushroom Rocks (22 m)  
7 mile North Wall (22 m)  
8 mile (19 m)  
8-Mile 2  
8-Mile 3  
8 mile	Ramsey (18 m)  
9 mile (18 m)  
9 mile 9 tree	 
9 mile 9-Mile green tree  
9 mile Breaking Waters	(16 m)  
9 mile drop off (23 m)  
9 mile	tree  
Diepgat South (64 m)

Prohibited activities

Geography
The shoreline is mostly sandy beach with a few outcrops of more resistant rock forming  occasional headlands, as at Jesser Point. The seabed of the shelf is largely covered by sand and coarse, shelly sediment, with patches of coral reef. The reefs in the vicinity of Jesser Point are generally named for their distance from the launching area in the bay protected by the point.

The southward-flowing Agulhas Current has a strong influence on the oceanic and coastal environment of the MPA, as it brings warm waters from the tropics along the edge of the continental shelf, which is close inshore and relatively shallow, however, there is a net northward longshore transport of sediment along the coast. In combination with cross-shelf sand movements, this strongly affects intertidal habitats, and tends to cover the rocky shores with sand. Tidal range is about1.5 to 2 m. This is a high energy coast with the predominant swell direction from the southeast for about 40% of the year, though prolonged north-easterly winds can produce a north-easterly swell.

Ecology

The MPA is in the tropical Delagoa ecoregion in the far north of kwaZulu-Natal. The marine biome is characterised by a wrm sea

Five major habitats exist in the sea in this region, distinguished by the nature of the substrate. The substrate, or base material, is important in that it provides a base to which an organism can anchor itself, which is vitally important for those organisms which need to stay in one particular kind of place. Rocky shores and reefs provide a firm fixed substrate for the attachment of plants and animals, as do reef building corals. Coral reefs are a biotic equivalent, usually with greater rugosity and high biodiversity. Sandy beaches and sedimentary bottoms are a relatively unstable substrate and cannot anchor many of the benthic organisms, but allow many organisms to live within the substrate. Submarine canyons are relatively deep and often provide shelter from currents. Finally there is the pelagic zone of open water, above the substrate, where the organisms must drift or swim. Mixed habitats are also frequently found, which are a combination of those mentioned above. There are no estuarine habitats in the MPA, but several are immediately adjacent.

iSimangaliso protects the southernmost extent of coral reefs in Africa, long sandy beaches, and deep submarine canyons. Two distinct coastal marine biogeographic regions meet in the Park at Cape Vidal. To the north is the Maputaland sub-province of the Tropical Indo-West Pacific Province, which extends to Ponta do Oura, and supports many tropical species not found anywhere else in South Africa. To the south, the Natal Sub-province of the Sub-tropical East Coast Province extends to Cape St Lucia, and supports many endemic species.

Rocky shores and reefs
There are rocky reefs and mixed rocky and sandy bottoms. For many marine organisms the substrate is another type of marine organism, and it is common for several layers to co-exist.

The type of rock of the reef is of some importance, as it influences the range of possibilities for the local topography, which in turn influences the range of habitats provided, and therefore the diversity of inhabitants. Sandstone and other sedimentary rocks erode and weather very differently to igneous and metamorphic rock, and depending on the direction of dip and strike, and steepness of the dip, may produce reefs which are relatively flat to very high profile and full of small crevices. These features may be at varying angles to the shoreline, currents, and wave fronts.

Coral reefs 
The coral reefs of the iSimangaliso MPA are at the southern limit of the geographic range of coral reefs of the Western Indian Ocean.
These reefs are not formed by the usual accretion process, but are a relatively thin layer on a substrate of Pleistocene sandstone. Nevertheless, they have a high biodiversity for a high latitude community. They can be grouped into northern, central and southern reef complexes, of which the central region at Sodwana Bay is the part used by recreational divers. The northern reefs are relatively inaccessible to tourists and the southern area is in a sanctuary.

Sandy beaches and sedimentary bottoms
Sedimentary bottoms at first glance appear to be fairly barren areas, as they lack the stability to support many of the spectacular reef based species, and the variety of large organisms is relatively low. The sediment is continually being moved around by wave action, to a greater or lesser degree depending on weather conditions and exposure of the area. This means that sessile organisms must be specifically adapted to areas of relatively loose substrate to thrive in them, and the variety of species found on a sandy or gravel bottom will depend on all these factors. Sedimentary bottoms have one important compensation for their instability, animals can burrow into the sediment and move up and down within its layers, which can provide feeding opportunities and protection from predation. Other species can dig themselves holes in which to shelter, or may feed by filtering water drawn through the tunnel, or by extending body parts adapted to this function into the water above the sand.

The open sea

Submarine canyons
There are several submarine canyons along the edge of the continental shelf. These occasioanally deflect deeper, colder, water to the shallower reef areas, where it mixes with the upper layers and has an overall cooling effect, which is thought may affect susceptibility to coral bleaching. These canyons are known to support a resident population of coelacanths at a relatively shallow depth compared to most other populations, and the coelacanths are known to require relatively cold, well oxygenated water.

Marine species diversity

325 species of seaweeds, 129 corals, 22 marine mammals, 991 marine fish, 812 marine molluscs, and 20 sponges are listed in the species checklists of the 1999 World Heritage schedules and the iSimangaliso Wetland Park rare, threatened and endemic species project. This list is not exhaustive.

Animals
The beaches of the MPA are a nesting site for loggerhead and leatherback turtles.

There is a resident population of West Indian Ocean coelacanths in the upper parts of the shelf-edge canyons.

Seaweeds
Listing of seaweed taxa recorded from the waters of the MPA or for which the MPA is within their recorded range:

Green algae (Chlorophyceae):

Ulva fasciata
Ulva intestinalis
Ulva rigida
Anadyomene wrightii
Microdictyon kraussii
Chaetomorpha antennina
Cladophora horii
Cladophora ordinata
Cladophora rugulosa endemic
Cladophora vagabunda
Chamaedoris delphinii
Boodlea composita
Cladophoropsis herpestica
Dictyosphaera cavernosa
Dictyosphaera versluysii
Phyllodictyon anastomosans
Valonia macrophysa
Valoniopsis pachynema
Bryopsis myosuroides as far north as Rabbit Rock
Trichosolen hainanensis north of Mabibi
Caulerpa brachypus forma parvifolia
Caulerpa cupressoides north of Mabibi
Caulerpa filiformis
Caulerpa mexicana
Caulerpa nummularia
Caulerpa racemosa var.laetevirens
Caulerpa racemosa var.lamourouxii
Caulerpa racemosa var.peltata
Caulerpa scalpelliformis var. intermedia
Caulerpa serrulata var. hummii
Caulerpa taxifolia var. asplenioides
Caulerpa webbiana
Caulerpa zeyheri
Codium caputatum
Codium duthiae
Codium lucasii
Codium megalophysum
Codium mozambiquense
Codium papenfussii
Codium platylobium south of Mmtwalume river
Codium prostratum
Halimeda cuneata
Halimeda gracilis
Halimeda tuna
Preudocodium de-vriesii
Pseudocodium floridanum
Chlorodesmis hidenbrandtii
Udotea orientalis
Bornetella nitida
Dasycladus ramosus
Neomeris van-bosseae

Brown algae (Phaeophyceae):

Ralfsia expansa
Dictyopteris delicatula
Dictyopteris ligulata
Dictyopteris macrocarpa
Dictyota cervicornis north of Mission Rocks
Dictyota ciliolata north of Mabibi
Dictyota friabilis
Dictyota humifusa
Lobophora variegata
Padina boergesenii
Padina boryana
Spatoglossum asperium
Stoechospermum polypodioides
Stypopodium multipartitum
Zonaria subarticulatum
Chnoosporum minima
Colpomenia sinuosa
Endarachne binghamiae
Hydroclathrus clathratus
Cystoseira myrica
Hormophysa cuneiformis north of Rabbit Rock
Sargassum crassifolium north from Sodwana Bay
Sargassum elegans
Turbinaria ornata

Red algae (Rhodophyceae):

Dichotomaria diesingiana south of Cape Vidal
Dichotomaria tenera
Galaxaura obtusata
Galaxaura rugosa north from Sodwana Bay
Tricleocarpa cylindrica north from Sodwana
Liagora ceranoides Sodwana Bay
Liagora divaricata north from Sodwana Bay
Scinaia bengalica Sodwana Bay
Gelidium abbottiorum south of Kosi Bay
Gelidium foliacum south of Sodwana Bay
Gelidium reptans
Pterocladiella caerulescens
Ptilophora helenaeMission Rocks
Ptilophora heldebrandtii north from Sodwana Bay
Gelidiella acerosa north from just south of Sodwana Bay
Gracilaria aculeata south of Cape Vidal, SA endemic
Gracilaria canaliculata north from Cape Vidal
Gracilaria corticata 
Gracilaria denticulata
Gracilaria salicornia north of Cape Vidal
Gracilaria vieillardii
Asparagopsis taxiformis
Amphiroa beauvoisii
Amphiroa ephedraea
Arthrocardia carinata
Arthrocardia flabellata
Jania cultrata reported as Cheilosporum cultratum
Cheilosporum proliferum
Corallina officinalis south of Mission Rocks
Haliptilon roseum north from Sodwana Bay
Jania adhaerans
Jania intermedia
Jania verrucosa
Metamastophora flabellata
Gibsmithia hawaiiensis
Hypnaea rosea
Hyonea spicifera
Hypnea tenuis
Hypnea viridis
Sonderophycus capensis recorded as Peyssonnelia capensis
Phacelocarpus tristichus north from Sodwana Bay
Portieria hornemannii
Portieria tripinnata
Callophycus condominius
Meristotheca papulosa
Plocamium beckeri
Plocamium corallorhiza
Plocamium suhrii south of Mission Rocks
Plocamium telfairiae north of Cape Vidal
Carpopeltis maillardii 
Carpopeltis phyllophora
Halymenia durvillei
Prionitis nodifera south of Mission Rocks
Thamnoclonium dichotomum south of Sodwana Bay
Predaea feldmannii Sodwana Bay
Platoma cyclocolpum Sodwana Bay
Champia compressa
Champia indica Sodwana Bay
Botryocladia leptopoda Sodwana Bay
Gelidiopsis repens
Halichrysis coalescens
Rhodymenia natalensis
Balliella crouanioides
Ceramium flaccidum
Ceramium poppigianum
Euptilota fergusoni north from Sodwana Bay
Pleonosporium caribaeun
Spyridia hypmoides south of Black Rock
Wrangelia argus
Wrangelia pinicillata
Dasya stanleyi
Acrosorium ciliolatum
Augophyllum marginifructum north from Leadsman shoal
Bartoniella crenata south of Mission Rocks
Martensia elegans south from Sodwana Bay
Martensia flabelliformis Sodwana Bay
cf. Myriogramma prostrata Sodwana Bay
Acrocystis nana north from Island Rock
Amansia rhodantha
Bostrychia tenella
Chondria armata
Digenea simplex north of Mission Rocks
Halopithys subopaca north from Mapelane
Laurencia brongniartii
Laurencia complanata
Laurencia natalensis
Laurencia pumila
Neurymenia fraxinifolia
Neurymenia nigricans north from St. Lucia
Osmundaria melvillii north from Sodwana Bay 
Osmundaria serrata south of Mission Rocks
Placophora binderi
Plectrophora natalensis
Polysiphonia incompta
Polyzonia elegans
Rhodomelopsis africana

Endemism
The MPA is in the tropical Delagoa ecoregion in the north of kwaZulu-Natal, which extends from Cape Vidal northwards into Mozambique. There are some species endemic to South Africa along this coastline.

Alien invasive species

Threats

High levels of fishing in the reserve are a threat to the population of some species.

Coral bleaching events:
When the large mass coral bleaching event occurred in the Western Indian Ocean in 1998, reefs in the northern region off Kenya, the Maldives and Seychelles lost extensive coral cover, but severity decreased to the south and there was very little on the reefs of the MPA. There was a suggestion that the South African reefs could constitute refugia from climate change, but in 2005 an anomalous warm-water  event caused moderate bleaching on these reefs. As this was the first time such bleaching had been observed in this area, there is little data available on the environmental stress, resistance, adaptation and community changes of these reefs, and a long term monitoring project has been started.

It has been hypothesised that the small-scale, local upwelling events caused by canyons along the shelf-edge may have an effect on the corals, but it is unknown whether this is protective, by cooling the water, or whether acclimatisation to cooler water makes the corals more sensitive to raised sea temperatures. Consequently, a monitoring program for water temperature has been started.

Slipways and harbours in the MPA
There are no harbours or slipways. Beach launches through the surf are standard procedure for fishing and dive boats.

See also

References

Marine protected areas of South Africa
Marine biodiversity of South Africa
Underwater diving sites in South Africa